Drakes Broughton is a village in Worcestershire, England. The village is located on the B4084 road (previously the A44) 2 miles north-west of Pershore and 7 miles south-east of Worcester. The village has two pubs; the Old Oak and the Plough and Harrow. Its school, St Barnabas, contains a Pre-School, First School and a Middle School, which then feeds into Pershore High School in nearby Pershore. Drakes Broughton has a recreation ground, on which the village's football teams play.  The recreation ground is situated next to the village's church, St Barnabas School, and the village hall. Drakes Broughton has other amenities including a general store, hairdressers, and a fish and chip shop.

The village gave its name to an early composition by Elgar, written in about 1878, a hymn tune with words by Francis Stanfield (1835-1914).

References

External links

Villages in Worcestershire
Wychavon